Keemat – They Are Back is a 1998 Indian Hindi-language action film directed by Sameer Malkan and produced by brothers Ganesh Jain and Ramesh Jain. It stars Akshay Kumar, Saif Ali Khan, Raveena Tandon and Sonali Bendre. Anupam Kher and Ravi Kishen have supporting roles. This was the fourth collaboration between Kumar and Khan after hits like Main Khiladi Tu Anari, Yeh Dillagi and Tu Chor Main Sipahi.

Synopsis 

Two brothers Dev and Ajay who are thieves as well as con-men by profession, used to cheat people. Sharmili being also a thief meets Dev and Ajay in a pub, steals their wallets and runs away from there. On the way some goons attack her, but Dev and Ajay save her. Sharmili is impressed with Dev's fighting skill and believes he is a good human being, so she falls in love with him. Then, Dev and Ajay accidentally kill a young man named Mohan Tripathi. This weighs heavily on their minds, so they find out the address of the deceased and travel to his village called Badlapur. They learn that Mohan went to Mumbai for his further studies for being a doctor. They meet Mohan's father, Dinanath Tripathi, his mother, Sulakshana, a sister, and Mohan's wife, but are unable to tell them the sad news. So they lie and tell the Tripathis that Mohan is alive, and they are his friends. They decide to stay to assist the Tripathis. In this village Ajay meets Mansi, a village girl, and they fall in love. Sharmili then arrives in Badlapur seeking Dev. Dev also starts loving Sharmili.

Dev and Ajay learn that this village is being terrorized by a tyrannical land-owner named Bhanu Pratap Singh and his men. Bhanu Pratap wants to seize the lands of the poor villagers at any cost, so that he can start building on it. With the course of the story it is revealed that Bhanu Pratap brutally killed his honest elder brother as well as the original land-owner of this village Thakur Suraj Pratap Singh and his wife to seize all the "zamindari" in the past. Dev and Ajay start opposing Bhanu Pratap and his men. Meanwhile, Mohan's wife who is pregnant with Mohan's child, had died during her labour pain because there is no hospital at that village, and the doctor from the other village came late. That time Dev and Ajay reveal the truth of Mohan's death in front of everyone and also confess that they were responsible for his accidental death. Then Dinanath drives them away from the village but they stay there and save the villagers from Bhanu Pratap's torture.

Then Bhanu Pratap finds out with the help of Lala Wajanlal, a greedy money-lender that Ajay has vices of drinking and gambling — and he decides to exploit this in order to separate the two brothers, He creates differences and bitterness between Dev and Ajay and starts taking advantage of the situation. Ajay succumbs to his temptation to gamble and starts losing money. Shortly thereafter he has lost all his money. Humiliated, he steals some gold bangles belonging to the Tripathis and sells them, so that he can continue playing. Dev finds out about this theft, and thus begins the rift between the two brothers that Bhanu has been waiting for. But later it is revealed that Ajay's transformation was a master plan schemed by both Dev and Ajay to deceive Bhanu Pratap and to get money from him by winning his confidence, so that they can use the money to build a hospital in the village which was Dinanath's dream too. When Bhanu Pratap discovers their conspiracy, he attacks them and Dinanath's family with his goons. They fight with the goons, save Dinanath and his family, specially Dinanath's daughter and the poor villagers. Meanwhile, Bhanu Pratap publicly reveals that Mohan was not accidentally killed by Dev and Ajay, it was he who intentionally killed Mohan by hitting him by his car. Dev then kills Bhanu Pratap. Then everyone unites.

Cast 

 Akshay Kumar as Dev Rana
 Raveena Tandon as Sharmili
 Saif Ali Khan as Ajay
 Sonali Bendre as Mansi
 Anupam Kher as Dinanath Tripathi
 Dalip Tahil as Bhanu Pratap Singh / Singhania
 Shakti Kapoor as Lala Wajanlal
 Moushmi Chatterjee as Sulakshana (Mohan's mother)
 Avtar Gill as Ajay and Dev's foster father
 Ravi Kishan as Mohan
 Johnny Lever as Sub-inspector Ultappan / Veerappan
 Mukesh Khanna as Thakur Suraj Pratap Singh
 Kiran Javeri (as Mohan's wife)
 Babu Anthony as Villain
 Sheetal Suvarna as Sharda (Mohan's sister)

Production 
This film was delayed for 2 years. Manisha Koirala was offered the role of Mansi but was replaced by Sonali Bendre. Saif Ali Khan's role was offered before to Ajay Devgn. It was the last film of Akshay Kumar and Raveena Tandon before their breakup. Armaan Kohli was approached but he was busy in Qahar.

Soundtrack 
The music was directed by Rajesh Roshan. The song "Koi Nahin Tere Jaisa" was a copy of Cotton Eye Joe by Rednex.

Box office 
The film was released on (10-April-1998) at 150 screen's.

First weekend collection was (₹1,47,00,000) and All time rank was (718). Footfalls collection was (47,68,000) and Adjusted netgross collection was (₹45,85,38,560).

Overseas first weekend collection was (US$25,000) and worldwide first weekend collection was (₹2,61,30,750). Overseas first week collection was (US$40,000) and worldwide first week collection was (₹4,48,53,000). Total netgross collection was (₹5,18,00,000) and films verdict was declared as "Average" at Indian Boxoffice.

On IMDb it was rated at 5.7/10 stars and it was 17 (seventeenth) highest-grossing film of 1998 on "Boxoffice India".

External links

References

https://timesofindia.com/entertainment/hindi/movie-details/keemat/amp_movieshow/62523426/

1998 films
1998 action films
1990s Hindi-language films
Films scored by Rajesh Roshan
Indian action films
1990s masala films
Films about con artists